Saint Vincent is a French musician who created the industrial black metal band Blacklodge in 1998 in which he is the lead vocalist, guitarist and machine programmer. He is also the lead vocalist of the Parisian black/death metal band Vorkreist, and plays the guitars and the bass in the French black metal band The Arrival of SataN. His early influences are Megadeth and Darkthrone.

Discography

Blacklodge 
Login:SataN (2003)
>SolarKult< (2006)
T/ME (2010)
 Machination (2012)

Vorkreist 
 Sickness Sovereign (2009)
 Sigil Whore Christ (2012)

The Arrival of SataN 
 "Darkness Dealer (2003)
 Vexing Verses"" (2009)

Other appearances 
 Merrimack ex-live vocalist
 Loudblast author of Hazardous Magic lyrics from the album Frozen Moments Between Life and Death (2011)
 Hyena Hyena EP (Lennart The Lycanthrope outro) (2007)
 :fr:Burn Paris Burn movie original soundtrack (2009)
 Secrets of the Moon Privilegivm special limited edition (Black Halo remix by Blacklodge) (2009)
 Pavillon Rouge Solmeth Pervitine (intro speech on Les membranes vertes de l'espace) (2012)
 Faust, guitarist, first local band from Grenoble (1994/1998).

References

External links 
 Saint Vincent Discography Discogs
 Blacklodge on Encyclopedia Metallum Encyclopedia Metallum
 Vorkreist on Encyclopedia Metallum Encyclopedia Metallum
 TheArrival Of SataN on Encyclopedia Metallum Encyclopedia Metallum

1976 births
French guitarists
French rock singers
French bass guitarists
Male bass guitarists
Living people
21st-century French singers
21st-century bass guitarists
21st-century French male singers
French male guitarists